Women's curling is the practice of curling by women. It has been part of the Winter Olympic Games since the 1998 Olympics in Nagano. Major women's curling tournaments include the Scotties Tournament of Hearts and the World Women's Curling Championship.

Bibliography
Tan Wei-dong, Hong Lin, "Discussion of the 2006 World Ladies Curling Championship", China Winter Sports, 2007.
Tan Wei-dong, Li Xue-qin, Wang Bing-yu, "Discussion of the Probability about Chinese Lady Curling Team Playing Well in the 2010 Olympic Winter Games", China Winter Sports, 2007.
Xu Yong-sheng, "Technical Contrast between Chinese and Korean Women Curling Team in the 6th Asian Winter Games", China Winter Sports, 2007.
Tan Wei-dong, "Analysis on the Advantage and Shortage of Chinese Ladies Curling Team for Preparing the 2010 Olympic Winter Games — My Thought on the 2008 World ladies Curling Championship", China Winter Sports, 2008.
Beverly D. Leipert, Robyn Plunkett, Donna Meagher-Stewart, Lynn Scruby, Heather Mair, Kevin B. Wamsley "'I Can't Imagine My Life Without It!': Curling and Health Promotion: A Photovoice Study", Canadian Journal of Nursing Research, vol. 43, n°1, March 2011, pp. 60–78.
Katherine A. Tamminen, Peter R.E. Crocker, "'I control my own emotions for the sake of the team': Emotional self-regulation and interpersonal emotion regulation among female high-performance curlers", Psychology of Sport and Exercise, vol. 14|n°5, September 2013, pp. 737–747.
Shou Zhong Zhang, "Analysis of Specific Cognitive Ability Characteristics of Chinese Women Curling Athletes", Advanced Materials Research, vol. 971-973, June 2014, pp. 2736–2739.

See also